The year 680 BC was a year of the pre-Julian Roman calendar. In the Roman Empire, it was known as year 74 Ab urbe condita . The denomination 680 BC for this year has been used since the early medieval period, when the Anno Domini calendar era became the prevalent method in Europe for naming years.

Events 
 By place 

 Europe 
 A meteorite hits the Estonian island of Saaremaa, forming the Kaali crater (approximate date).

 By topic 

 Sports 
 Greece's games of the 25th Olympiad is held at Olympia with the first equestrian event. A four-horse chariot race is run at the nearby hippodrome, slaves driving the chariots in a fierce competition that not infrequently ends in death.

Births
 Archilochus, Greek lyric poet (approximate date)

Deaths

References